The 1899 A&M Aggies football team represented the Agricultural and Mechanical College of Texas—now known as Texas A&M University—as an independent during the 1899 college football season. Led by first-year head coach W. A. Murray, the Aggies compiled a record of 4–2.

Schedule

References

 "1899 Schedule/Results." Texas A&M football record, 1899. Aggie Athletics. Retrieved on May 2, 2008.
 

Texas AandM
Texas A&M Aggies football seasons
Texas AandM Aggies football